Radoslav Hlapen (1350–1383) was a Serbian magnate who served Serbian Emperor Stefan Dušan (r. 1331–1355) and Stefan Uroš V (r. 1355–71) as vojvoda (military commander). He took part in the conquest of Byzantine lands, and was given a region north of Thessaly to govern in the early 1350s.

Origin
It is believed that Radoslav Hlapen is the same person as župan (count) Hlapen who governed Konavle and the wider Trebinje region in the 1330s. He was possibly the son of župan Radoslav, and thus named Radoslav after his father. Another theory is that he was the son of Syrgiannes Palaiologos.

Byzantine Emperor John VI Kantakouzenos (r. 1347–54) mentioned him as among the most important nobles, and he was called a relative of Dušan.

Service under Stefan Dušan
Serres was captured in September 1345, Veria in the first half of 1346. Veria and the surrounding towns were recuperated by John VI Kantakuzenos. After the military conquests, perhaps by spring 1351, Hlapen returned the city to Serbian rule, with many cities and towns in the area. He was appointed governor of Edessa (Voden) and Veria (Ber), just north of Thessaly.

Emperor Dušan died in Devol, on 20 December 1355. Dušan was succeeded by his son Stefan Uroš V.

Service under Stefan Uroš V
After the death of the governor of Thessaly kesar Preljub (1356), Preljub's son Thomas' claim to the region was asserted by the widow Irene. The Preljubović family was forced to flee to Serbia after the advance of Nikephoros II Orsini in 1356.  Irene married Radoslav Hlapen, who adopted Thomas.

Despot Simeon Uroš, the brother of Dušan, was appointed governor of Epirus and Acarnania in 1348. Following the death of Dušan and subsequent invasion of Nikephoros II, Simeon Uroš retreated to Kastoria, where he proclaimed himself "Emperor of Serbs, Greeks and Albanians". Simeon Uroš acquired the support of John Komnenos Asen (the brother-in-law of Dušan). In response, the Serbian nobility held a council in April 1357 at Skopje, in which they vowed to support Emperor Uroš, according to Dušan's will. In the summer of 1358, Simeon Uroš advanced on Zeta but was stopped at Skadar, where his army of 5,000 men was defeated by the Serbian nobility. Simeon Uroš returned to Kastoria, and never again tried to acquire Serbia. During the absence of Simeon Uroš in Epirus (1359), Hlapen invaded Thessaly on behalf of his stepson Thomas. Simeon Uroš was forced to cut his losses by recognizing Radoslav Hlapen's conquests, turning over Kastoria to him, and marrying his daughter Maria to Thomas.  Hlapen continued to recognize Uroš' suzerainty, and provided a buffer between Uroš V and Simeon Uroš. After the treaty between Hlapen and Simeon Uroš, the latter settled in Thessaly.
 

In 1365, a čelnik Radoslav was mentioned, referring either to Radoslav Hlapen or Radoslav Povika, the brother of logotet Đurađ.

Fall of the Serbian Empire
After the Battle of Maritsa (1371) he became one of the most powerful provincial lords.

Last years
He retired as a monk in the Vodoča monastery where he also was buried. His votive ring was found at the site. He also founded a church in Kučevište, Skopje, a monastery in Ostrovo, and a monastery in Greece.

Family 
 
He married Irina (Irene), the widow of caesar Preljub. They had the following issue:

Maria Angelina Radoslava, married Alexios Angelos Philanthropenos
Jelena, married Prince Marko
Unnamed, married Nikola Bagaš
Unnamed, married John Uroš
Stefan

Legacy
Mavro Orbini (1563–1614) called him "primo barone di Grecia" (1601).

See also
Nobility of the Serbian Empire

References

Sources
Books

Journals

1322 births
1380s deaths
14th-century Serbian nobility
Medieval Serbian military leaders
Medieval Macedonia
People of the Serbian Empire
Medieval Serbian magnates
Generals of Stefan Dušan
Boyars of Stefan Dušan